Captain Alec Stratford Cunningham-Reid  (20 April 1895 – 26 March 1977), known in his early life as Alec Stratford Reid, was a British First World War flying ace credited with seven aerial victories. After the war, he entered politics as a Conservative, serving as a Member of Parliament (MP) for periods between 1922 and 1945.

Early life 
Cunningham-Reid was born in Wayland, Norfolk, the son of the Reverend Arthur Morse Reid and his wife Agnes Celina Flower (1861–1941), a sister of Archibald Dennis Flower.

He joined the Royal Engineers during the First World War and was commissioned as a second lieutenant, transferring to the Royal Flying Corps. In August 1918, he was awarded the Distinguished Flying Cross, the citation reading:

Political career 
At the 1922 general election, Cunningham-Reid stood as the conservative candidate in Warrington, a Conservative-held borough constituency in Lancashire where the sitting member Sir Harold Smith was retiring.  He won the seat with a comfortable majority in a two-way contest with the Labour Party candidate.  However, at the next general election, in 1923, the addition of a Liberal Party candidate saw him lose to Labour's Charles Dukes.

The Liberals in Warrington did not field a candidate at the 1924 general election, and Reid was returned to the House of Commons for the next five years. At the 1929 election he did not stand in Warrington, but instead sought election in Southampton. This was a two-seat constituency, where both the sitting members were Conservatives not seeking re-election. Having returned only Conservatives since 1922, this might have been regarded as safer Conservative territory than Warrington, but Labour won both seats.

Cunningham-Reid's next chance to return to the Commons came in 1932, when the Conservative member Sir Rennell Rodd resigned from Parliament. This caused a by-election in his inner London constituency of St Marylebone, where Cunningham-Reid was adopted as the candidate of the St Marylebone Conservative and Constitutional Union, which was the official Conservative and Unionist organisation in the area. However, a number of local Conservatives who opposed his adoption left to form the rival St Marylebone Conservative Association and nominated their own candidate, Sir B. P Blackett.  It was customary for the Conservative Party leader (then Stanley Baldwin) to send a letter of support to the party's candidate, but both Blackett and Cunningham-Reid each claimed to be the official Conservative nominee, and Baldwin did not endorse either of them.  No other candidates were nominated, so the election became a two-way contest between the rival Conservatives. In the event, Cunningham-Reid won the seat with a slender majority of 1,013 (4.6% of the votes), and held it for a further thirteen years.  At the 1935 general election he was returned as the sole Conservative candidate with a huge majority over his Labour opponent.

In 1943 the St Marylebone Conservative and Constitutional Union was disaffiliated from the National Union of Conservative and Unionist Associations in favour of the rival St Marylebone Conservative Association, which had remained in existence since the 1932 split. At the 1945 general election, Cunningham-Reid retained the support of the Conservative and Constitutional Union, but was opposed by Wavell Wakefield, a former captain of the England national rugby union team, who received the Conservative Association's endorsement. Without official party support, Cunningham-Reid fared poorly, finishing third with only 11% of the votes. Wavell won the seat with a comfortable majority over the second-placed Labour candidate.

In Parliament 
On 28 July 1943, Cunningham-Reid was involved in an exchange of blows in the lobby of the House of Commons with fellow Conservative MP Oliver Locker-Lampson. Cunningham-Reid's description of the incident was that after a verbal dispute,

The following day, both MPs made a formal apology in the House of Commons. On 30 July Cunningham-Reid made a personal statement in which he explained to the House that the matter had arisen after Locker-Lampson had accused him of leaving London during the Blitz, whereas he claimed to have departed on a 14-week trip before the Blitz started. The incident became front-page news in Britain, and was reported in several major American newspapers — including the Los Angeles Times, which ran the story under the headline "England Grins as Members of Commons Trade Punches".

Personal life 
Cunningham-Reid was married twice.  His first marriage, on 12 May 1927, was to The Hon. Ruth Mary Clarisse Ashley (1906–1986), daughter of Lt.-Col. Wilfrid William Ashley, 1st and last Baron Mount Temple and Amalia Mary Maud Cassel, a multimillionaire. The couple, described by The Cincinnati Enquirer as "England's wealthiest girl and handsomest man", had two children: Michael Duncan Alec Cunningham-Reid (1928–2014) and Noel Robert Cunningham-Reid (1930–2017). On their honeymoon, she insisted that they share her wealth because "no decent woman likes to have a man live with her in charity", but when the couple divorced in 1940, he sued for half of her $400,000 annual income.

In 1944 Cunningham-Reid married secondly Angela Williams, and they were divorced about 1949.  During the Second World War he conducted an affair with the American heiress Doris Duke.

Death 
Cunningham-Reid died in Valbonne, France, on 26 March 1977.

References

External links 

1895 births
1977 deaths
People from Breckland District
Royal Flying Corps officers
British World War I flying aces
Recipients of the Distinguished Flying Cross (United Kingdom)
Conservative Party (UK) MPs for English constituencies
UK MPs 1922–1923
UK MPs 1924–1929
UK MPs 1931–1935
UK MPs 1935–1945
Royal Engineers officers
Royal Air Force officers
Military personnel from Norfolk
Royal Air Force personnel of World War I